Hong Dagu (Mongolian name: Charghu 察爾球) (1244–1291) was a Korean commander of the Yuan dynasty. His given name was Jun-gi (俊奇; 준기, zun4 qi2), but his courtesy name Dagu is far more famous. The Hong family dominated the Liaoyang province in Manchuria during the late 13th and the early 14th centuries.

See also
 List of Goryeo people
 History of China
 History of Korea
 Manchuria under Yuan rule

13th-century Korean people
1244 births
1291 deaths
Korean generals
Yuan dynasty generals
Mongolian people of Korean descent